Nikolas Vogel (9 March 1967 – 28 June 1991) was an Austrian-German film actor and news camera operator. Nikolas Vogel belonged to a family of famous actors and he also became an actor. Vogel left the acting profession to report the news and worked for a short time as journalist before he was killed in the Ten-Day War as Yugoslavia was dividing in the aftermath of Marshall Josip Broz Tito's death. Vogel was killed in a missile incident along with his Austrian colleague Norbert Werner.

Personal
Nikolas Vogel was born on 9 March 1967 in Vienna, Austria. He was born into an acting family. His mother, Gertraud Jesserer, was a well known Austrian theater, cinema and television actress. She appeared in theater performances at the Deutsches Schauspielhaus in Hamburg, Burgtheater in Vienna, and the Munich Kammerspiele among others. She had a starring role and appeared in the Austrian, German-language TV show Familie Leitner.

His father Peter Vogel was a well known German actor, whose career included a role in the 1978 US TV Miniseries Holocaust. His grandfather was Rudolf Vogel and also a famous and successful actor. His grandfather was acting at the Landesbühne in Munich, Staatstheater and the Munich Kammerspiele. He did several film productions as well. Nikolas had a younger brother Michael.

Film career
Nikolas Vogel acted in movies and TV shows before becoming a journalist. Acting in teenage roles, Vogel had a starring role in The Inheritors (1984). His character, Thomas Feigl, is a young boy who joins a neo-Nazi group. 

Vogel's apparent maturity was reflected in his onscreen portrayals. In his early roles, he was often sexualized and shown naked. In The Inheritors, he has a frontal nude scene.

Requim for Dominic (1991)
Eurocops (TV series, 1989 episode)
O zivej vode (TV movie, 1988)
Bibos Maenner (1986)
Herzklopfen (1985)
The Inheritors (1983) 
Was Kostet Der Sieg? (1981)

Journalism career

Death
Vogel was working as a freelance photojournalist when he was killed along with colleague Norbert Werner on 28 June 1991 at the Ljubljana Airport, Slovenia. They were both killed by a missile that struck their car during a Yugoslav Federal Army attack on the airport during Ten-Day War after Slovenia declared its independence.

Memorial
Slovenia celebrated its entry into the Schengen Treaty with other European countries at the site where Vogel and Werner were killed. The two journalists were acknowledged at the celebration.

See also
 Ten-Day War#28 June 1991 & Ten-Day War#Casualties
 Ljubljana Jože Pučnik Airport
 List of Austrian films of the 1980s
List of journalists killed in Europe

References

Bibliography
 Holmstrom, John. The Moving Picture Boy: An International Encyclopaedia from 1895 to 1995. Norwich, UK: Michael Russell, 1996, pg. 367.

External links
 Newseum online exhibits for Nick Vogel and Norbert Werner.

1967 births
1991 deaths
Austrian male film actors
Journalists killed while covering the Yugoslav Wars
20th-century Australian male actors
Male actors from Vienna
20th-century Austrian male actors
Filmed killings
20th-century Austrian journalists